Miller Westford Barber, Jr. (March 31, 1931 – June 11, 2013) was an American professional golfer who enjoyed significant success on the PGA Tour in the 1960s and 1970s, and a greater degree of success on the Senior PGA Tour (now the Champions Tour) in the 1980s.

Career
Barber was born in Shreveport, Louisiana. He spent much of his life in Texarkana, Texas. He graduated from the University of Arkansas in 1954, turned professional four years later, and won his first PGA Tour event in 1964. He earned 11 career tour wins, but did not win a major championship. The closest he came was in 1969 at the U.S. Open at Houston, where he held a three-shot lead over the field after three rounds, but shot 78 in the last round to finish three shots behind winner Orville Moody. Earlier in April 1969, Barber entered the final round of the Masters Tournament two shots out of the lead and was paired in Sunday's final group with Billy Casper but shot a final round 74 (which included a birdie from under a tree on the 72nd hole) and finished in 7th place. He played on the Ryder Cup team in 1969 and 1971, and in the latter year was ranked sixth on the McCormack rankings.

In 1973, Barber won the longest regulation tournament in PGA Tour history. The World Open Golf Championship played at Pinehurst Country Club was a 144-hole affair. Barber won by three strokes over Ben Crenshaw.

Barber became eligible to play on the Senior PGA Tour around a year after it was founded. He was one of the dominant players on the tour throughout the 1980s, competing on even terms with players who had had much more distinguished earlier careers, such as Lee Trevino and Arnold Palmer. His 24 wins on the tour included five senior majors, three of them U.S. Senior Opens.

Barber holds the record for combined PGA Tour and Champions Tour starts at 1,297.

Barber played with an unusual looped backswing/downswing, but squared up very consistently through impact. Several other PGA Tour players, including Jim Furyk, have had success with similar methods.

Death
Barber died June 11, 2013 at the age of 82 of lymphoma in Scottsdale, Arizona. Barber was survived by his wife of 43 years, Karen, and sons Larry and Richard and stepsons Casey, Doug, Brad.

Professional wins (43)

PGA Tour wins (11)

*Note: The 1969 Kaiser International Open Invitational was shortened to 36 holes due to weather.

PGA Tour playoff record (3–4)

Other wins (1)
1962 Metropolitan Open

Senior PGA Tour wins (24)

*Note: The 1982 Hilton Head Seniors International was shortened to 36 holes due to inclement weather.

Senior PGA Tour playoff record (1–1)

Japan Senior wins (2)
1985 Coca-Cola Grandslam Championship 
1991 Fuji Electric Grandslam Championship

Other senior wins (5)
1982 Vintage Invitational
1985 Shootout at Jeremy Ranch (with Ben Crenshaw)
1987 Mazda Champions (with Nancy Lopez)
2002 Liberty Mutual Legends of Golf - Demaret Division (with Jim Ferree)
2003 Liberty Mutual Legends of Golf - Demaret Division (with Jim Ferree)

Results in major championships

DQ = disqualified
CUT = missed the half-way cut (3rd round cut in 1970 and 1974 Open Championships)
"T" indicates a tie for a place

Summary

Most consecutive cuts made – 12 (1966 U.S. Open – 1970 U.S. Open)
Longest streak of top-10s – 5 (1968 PGA – 1969 PGA)

Champions Tour major championships

Wins (5)

U.S. national team appearances
Professional
Ryder Cup: 1969 (winners), 1971 (winners)

See also
List of golfers with most PGA Tour Champions wins
List of golfers with most Champions Tour major championship wins

References

External links

American male golfers
Arkansas Razorbacks men's golfers
PGA Tour golfers
PGA Tour Champions golfers
Winners of senior major golf championships
Ryder Cup competitors for the United States
Golfers from Shreveport, Louisiana
People from Texarkana, Texas
Deaths from lymphoma
Deaths from cancer in Arizona
1931 births
2013 deaths